This is a list of artists who have spent more than 1000 weeks on the UK Singles Chart and UK Albums Chart combined. Only 33 artists have achieved this milestone.  It uses the methodology used to compile a top 500 list in the British Hit Singles & Albums books until 2005. Any album or single must be credited to the named artist and must appear in the top 75 singles or albums chart as recorded by the Official Charts Company.

Ed Sheeran has the most weeks on the singles charts with 1448 weeks. Cliff Richard, Elvis Presley, Drake and Rihanna are the only other artists to achieve over 1000 weeks in the singles chart. Ed Sheeran has had the most weeks in the singles chart since 2000.

Queen have the most weeks on the albums chart with 1895 weeks followed by fifteen other artists with more than 1000 weeks, Ed Sheeran being the latest to pass this threshold in July 2021. David Bowie passed the 1000-week mark following his death in January 2016, when 16 of his albums entered or re-entered the top 75. ABBA's 'Gold' became the first album to reach 1000 weeks on the top 100 UK albums chart in July 2021.

Figures are as of week ending 16 March 2023.

See also 
 List of songs which have spent the most weeks on the UK Singles Chart

References

Lists of record chart achievements